Roberto Moreno (born 3 April 1970) is a Panamanian football referee. He refereed at 2014 FIFA World Cup qualifiers.

References

1970 births
Living people
Panamanian football referees
Copa América referees
CONCACAF Gold Cup referees
CONCACAF Champions League referees